An Urchin in the Storm is a 1987 essay collection from paleontologist and science writer Stephen Jay Gould.

Overview
All but one of the essays had originally appeared in The New York Review of Books. Grouped by theme, the sections of the book deal respectively with the irreducibility of history (and the pleasures and challenges of contingency) in its two principal domains of life and the earth, nature's complexity, the theory and consequences of biological determinism, and rationalism in explanation.  Thus it is philosophically the most important of Gould's works - as befits a book dedicated to Peter Medawar and especially Isaiah Berlin, since the latter shares with Gould a commitment against determinism, even though Gould had a Marxist background while Berlin is quintessentially anti-Marxist.

It was reviewed in The New York Times by Michiko Kakutani, who noted that although the pieces were technically book reviews, Gould "tends to use the subject at hand as a jumping-off point for more general discussions". Gould argued against Creationism and biological determinism, criticizing sociobiology and Arthur Jensen's theories about race and intelligence. Other subjects discussed included the nature of geological time and change, the 19th century Devonian controversy, which involved the identification of a major period of earth history, and the work of biologists Barbara McClintock, E. E. Just, G. E. Hutchinson, and Lewis Thomas.

References

1987 non-fiction books
American essay collections
Books by Stephen Jay Gould
English-language books
Science books
Works originally published in The New York Review of Books
W. W. Norton & Company books